Metagyrinus is a genus of beetles in the family Gyrinidae, containing the following species:

 Metagyrinus arrowi (Régimbart, 1907)
 Metagyrinus sinensis (Ochs, 1924)
 Metagyrinus vitalisi (Peschet, 1923)

References

Gyrinidae
Adephaga genera